Philibert Mees (13 May 1929, in Mechelen – 29 June 2006, in Mechelen) was a Flemish composer and pianist. He was murdered in June 2006.

In 1952, Mees obtained a degree at the Koninklijk Conservatory, the Royal conservatory of Antwerp. He studied under the pianists Stevan Bergmann and Geza Anda.

Mees formed a duo with BRT violist Roger Nauwelaers since the 1980s. In 1999, Mees received the Fuga prize, awarded by the Union of Belgian Composers.

Mees was killed in his home in Mechelen in July 2006 by two knife wounds to his chest.  His body was concealed in a bed cover and plastic hidden under his bed. Two days later, police apprehended a suspect after investigation of Mees' phone records.  The musician's twenty-year-old neighbour, Bilel Gheribi, a Tunisian immigrant, was sentenced for his murder in 2009.

References
De Standaard, Verdachte bekent moord op Mechelse pianist, 13 July 2006
Het Nieuwsblad, Speurders zoeken naar dader en motief, 4 July 2006
VRT Nieuws, Flemish pianist murdered, 6 July 2006
Radio 1 (VRT), Het Journaal (15h), 6 July 2006

1929 births
2006 deaths
Belgian composers
Male composers
Belgian pianists
Belgian murder victims
People murdered in Belgium
20th-century pianists
20th-century Belgian male musicians